Mount Proctor is a mountain in British Columbia, Canada located near Fernie. Scaling , this limestone mountain is home to a very popular hiking trail. The legend of Mount Proctor tells of a young Indian chief who could not decide whom to marry and was turned into the mountain. The Three Sisters peak facing Mount Proctor is said to be the three maidens. Before there was an Alpine resort at the Fernie Alpine Resort, there was an Alpine resort at Mount Proctor around 1960.

External links
 
 Fernie Worldweb

Elk Valley (British Columbia)
Proctor
Proctor
Kootenay Land District